Blechnum arcuatum, known locally as quil-quil, is a fern native with a natural range in Chile ranging from Ñuble River (~36° S) in the north to Aysén Region (~47° S) including adjacent areas of Argentina. It is found from sea level up to 1300 masl and is associated with water courses or humid road cuts.

Sources
 Florachilena.cl

Blechnaceae
Ferns of Argentina
Ferns of Chile